Sir John Arnott, 1st Baronet JP (26 July 1814 – 28 March 1898) was a Scottish-Irish entrepreneur and a major figure in the commercial and political spheres of late-19th century Cork. He was also founder of the Arnotts department chain.

Background
Born in Auchtermuchty, Fife, he was the son of John Arnott and his wife Elizabeth, daughter of Alexander Paton. 

Arnott arrived in Cork in 1837 to work at Grants of Patrick Street; he later opened his own shop which failed to prosper. After starting a business in Belfast which prospered he returned to Cork and opened a drapery store which he later expanded across Ireland and Britain, including Arnotts in Henry Street, Dublin and in Glasgow (where the name continued until the early-1990s).

Career

Among the other businesses he started or was involved in included Cash and Company Cork, Baldoyle and Cork Race Park Meetings, the City of Cork Steamship Company, Cork and Macroom Direct Railway, Passage Docks Shipbuilding Company, the Bristol General Steam Navigation Company and Arnotts Brewery Cork. 

He acquired the Irish Times and The Northern Whig newspapers, though he later disposed of the Whig over disputes relating to its editorial policy. His family retained a connection with the paper until the 1960s, although they had disposed of their interest earlier.

Arnott was elected Lord Mayor of Cork three times, in 1859, 1860 and 1861. H was also Sheriff of Cork City in 1871. He was Justice of the Peace for Cork City and County and served as Member of Parliament for Kinsale between 1859 and 1863. Arnott was created a Knight Bachelor by the Lord Lieutenant of Ireland in 1859 and became a baronet, of Baily, in the County of Dublin on 12 February 1896.

He was a philanthropist and was heavily involved into an investigation in the treatment of children at the Cork workhouse. In this period the Irish Poor Law Relief Bill was going through Parliament and he sat on the select committee. There is a plaque on St Patrick's Bridge in Cork that commemorates its opening by Arnott on 12 December 1861.

In 1896 he bought the Duke of Devonshire's Irish estate in County Cork for about £250,000, and turned it onto a 32,000 acre stud farm, both for his own interest in horse racing, and to improve the livestock of local farmers.

He married Mary, the daughter of John James McKinlay. See Arnott baronets for his descendants.

Arnott Street in Portobello, Dublin, is named for Arnott. In 1874, Arnott along with James Fitzgerald Lombard JP, a long-time director of Arnott's department store, and Edward McMahon purchased property in this area. Lombard Street West and McMahon Street were also eponymously named in this area.

Arms

See also
Irish Times
Arnott baronets

References

 Sean Beecher: Cork 365 Collins Press 2005 .
 Cork City Council website archive of Mayors
 Irish Times 'Sir John Arnott' 29 March 1898, p. 5
 R Nesbitt, 'At Arnotts of Dublin, 1843–1993, Dublin A&A Farmar 1993
 The Courier and Argus (Dundee) 23 April 1896

External links 
 

1814 births
1898 deaths
Baronets in the Baronetage of the United Kingdom
Businesspeople from County Cork
Businesspeople from County Dublin
Irish Presbyterians
Knights Bachelor
Members of the Parliament of the United Kingdom for County Cork constituencies (1801–1922)
People from Auchtermuchty
UK MPs 1859–1865
19th-century Irish businesspeople